Vasso is a surname and given name. Notable people with this name include:

 Dino Vasso (born 1987), American American football coach
 Vasso Karantasiou (born 1973)
 Vasso Kydonaki, Greek football player
 Vasso Papandreou (born 1944), Greek politician